South Weston is a village in Lewknor civil parish, about  south of Thame in Oxfordshire. There are about 19 households in the parish.

Manor
South Weston is recorded in the Domesday Book of 1086 and the Hundred Rolls of 1279. Both then and later in the Middle Ages, the parish's farming interests overlapped with those of neighbouring Wheatfield.

Parish church
The current Church of England parish church of Saint Lawrence was designed by the Gothic Revival architect R.C. Hussey and built in 1860. It is in a Decorated Gothic style and incorporates some elements of the previous Norman church. The font is 13th century, and there is a 14th-century tomb recess in the north wall of the chancel. Over the east window, on the outside is a statue of Saint Lawrence.

The armchairs in the church were given by the Reynardson family of Adwell. The church was renovated in 1988 to make it more suitable for holding services. Until the mid 19th century the church had strong links with The Queen's College, Oxford.

Salisbury Lodge

In South Weston a non-conformist chapel and a public house were built in about 1600. The pub was called The Salisbury Arms. After the chapel became unused, the chapel was converted into a barn for the use of the pub owners. The pub was converted into a house in 1982 and is now called Salisbury Lodge.

References

Sources and further reading

External links

Villages in Oxfordshire